The 2013–14 season is Scunthorpe United's 1st in the fourth division of English football since 2005, following their relegation from League One the previous season.

League Two Data

League table

Result Summary

Result by round

Kit

|
|

Squad

Statistics

|-
|colspan="14"|Players currently out on loan:

|-
|colspan="14"|Players who have left the club:

|}

Captains

Goalscorers

Disciplinary record

Suspensions served

Contracts

Transfers

In

Loans In

Out

Loans out

Fixtures and Results

Pre-season

League Two

FA Cup

League Cup

Johnstone's Paint Trophy

Overall summary

Summary

Score overview

2013-14
2013–14 Football League Two by team